The Tom and Jerry Show is a 2014 American animated television series produced by Warner Bros. Animation and Renegade Animation, based on the Tom and Jerry characters and theatrical cartoon series created by William Hanna and Joseph Barbera in 1940. It first premiered on March 1, 2014 in Canada on Teletoon and later premiered in the United States on Cartoon Network on April 9, 2014. Beginning in 2017, new episodes premiere on Boomerang SVOD.

Series overview

Episodes 
The scenarios indicate in colors by which episode used them:
 Magenta = Modern-Day Urban Setting (174 segments)
 Purple = Witches (25 segments)
 Blue = Detectives (42 segments)
 Orange = Science (8 segments)
 Cyan = Butler (34 segments)
 Red = Scary Thrillers (29 segments)
 Yellow = Farm (5 segments)
 Green = Fairy Tales (8 segments)

Season 1 (2014)

Film (2014)

Season 2 (2016–18) 
On February 6, 2016, the second season premiered on Cartoon Network. However, new episodes premiered internationally first starting with "Say Uncle".
To match closer to the original shorts, the number of running time for the segments was reduced from eleven to seven minutes each, which means three segments per half-hour, and the art style was changed.

Season 3 (2019) 
On May 23, 2018, Boomerang announced the third season of The Tom and Jerry Show was slated to be released on February 1, 2019.

Season 4 (2021)

Season 5 (2021)

References 

 General references 
  (Cartoon Network episodes)
  (Cartoon Network episodes)
  (Teletoon episodes)
 

Tom and Jerry
Lists of Cartoon Network television series episodes